The 17th Asian Table Tennis Championships 2005 were held in Jeju-do, South Korea, from 27 August to 2 September 2005. It was organised by the Korea Table Tennis Association under the authority of Asian Table Tennis Union (ATTU) and International Table Tennis Federation (ITTF).

Medal summary

Medal table

Events

See also
2005 World Table Tennis Championships
2005 Asian Cup Table Tennis Tournament

References

Asian Table Tennis Championships
Asian Table Tennis Championships
Table Tennis Championships
Table tennis competitions in South Korea
Asian Table Tennis Championships
Asian Table Tennis Championships
Asian Table Tennis Championships